John Stanistreet (7 April 1913 – 30 October 1971) was an Australian politician.

He was born in Bendigo to legal manager John Jepson Stanistreet and Maud McIlroy. He attended Bendigo High School and Dookie Agricultural College, and in 1929 began working for his father's accountancy firm. He eventually became principal accountant. On 9 January 1937 he married Glenice Boswell Leed; they had one son. During World War II he served in the Royal Australian Air Force, but was wounded in 1942 and invalided back to Australia in 1943. In 1955 he was elected to the Victorian Legislative Assembly as the Liberal and Country Party member for Bendigo, but he was defeated in 1958. Stanistreet died in Bendigo in 1971.

References

1913 births
1971 deaths
Liberal Party of Australia members of the Parliament of Victoria
Members of the Victorian Legislative Assembly
20th-century Australian politicians
Royal Australian Air Force personnel of World War II